Crassispira unicolor, common name the uniformly coloured pleurotoma, is a species of sea snail, a marine gastropod mollusk in the family Pseudomelatomidae.

Description
The length of the shell varies between 14 mm and 22 mm.

(Original description) The rather thick shell is oblong, pyramidal and pale brownish black. The whorls are smooth, encircled with a single row of granules near the suture, longitudinally ribbed below. The aperture is short. The siphonal canal is very short. The sinus is rounded.

Distribution
This species occurs in the Pacific Ocean off Panama.

References

 G.B. Sowerby I, Proc. Zool. Soc, 1833, p. 137

External links
 Biolib.cz: Crassispira unicolor
 
 

unicolor
Gastropods described in 1834